The Pucará culture was an archaeological culture which developed in Qullaw, along the north-western shore of Lake Titicaca. It was characterized by a hierarchy of sites made up several smaller centers and villages scattered throughout the northern basin of the Titicaca, ruled from its nucleus - the town of Pukara (from which the given name derives) with an approximate extension of 6 square kilometers, constituted the first properly urban settlement in the Titicaca basin. Its sphere of influence reached as far north as the Cuzco Valley and as far south as Tiahuanaco. The culture had two phases of development within the Formative Period: the Middle Formative (1400 to 550 BC), and Late Formative (550 BC to 400 AD). 

The Pukara engaged in agriculture, herding and fishing, domesticating the alpaca and constructing ridges and furrows that allowed agriculture in floodable lands on the shores of Lake Titicaca, which ensured intensive high-altitude agriculture. During that time complex knowledge on hydraulics and construction was acquired, and it was from this that the inhabitants of the highlands began to directly control diverse ecological landscapes, establishing permanent colonies along the western slope of the Andes in the inter-Andean valley of Cuzco and Moquegua (a development strategy that was subsequently consolidated and promoted by the Tiahuanaco).

They developed, especially in the second phase, a very particular vigorous sculpture and ceramic culture. Pukara ceramics are painted in various colours. They are finely made, and include many non-utilitarian forms, such as human and animal motifs. Pukara pottery and textiles are found widely in the middle Andean, and the coastal Pacific valleys, reaching out into Peru and Chile.

The rise of Tiwanaku may have contributed to the weakening of Pukara around 200 AD. The Pucará settlements were occupied by people from Tiwanaku, it is probable that the leaders of this social formation had taken the site of Pukara as a sacred place, and perhaps even assumed it as their paqarina or place of origin. They copied Pucará's architectural model and commissioned a vast number of workers and engineers to transfer it to their capital in the Tiwanaku Valley, in the southern basin. It is possible that at that time, the sculptures of Pukará had become objects of great religious and ritual value, their possession being a symbol of power and prestige.  

The name for the Pucará culture was derived from the word Pukara, referring to the fortresses and defense bastions constructed during the Late Intermediate Period.

See also
Chiripa culture
Wankarani culture

References

History of Peru
Andean civilizations
Indigenous culture of the Americas